Cyril Stachura (born 4 September 1965 in Stropkov) is a former football player from Slovakia and recently manager of FC Nitra.

External links
 FC Nitra profile

References

1965 births
Living people
Slovak footballers
FC VSS Košice players
1. FC Tatran Prešov players
Slovak football managers
Slovak Super Liga managers
People from Stropkov
Sportspeople from the Prešov Region
FC Nitra managers
Association footballers not categorized by position